Abdillahi Mohamed Dahir, also known as Cukuse is a Somali politician who served as the Minister of Livestock and Fisheries of Somaliland from February 2016 to December 2017.
He formerly served as the Minister of Information and National Guidance of Somaliland from June 2013 to February 2016.

See also

 Ministry of Information and National Guidance (Somaliland)
 Cabinet of Somaliland
 Ministry of Livestock & Fisheries (Somaliland)

References

|-

Living people
Government ministers of Somaliland
Somaliland politicians
Year of birth missing (living people)